Testvériség Sport Egyesület is a Hungarian football club from the town of Rákospalota, Budapest, Hungary.

History
Testvériség Sport Egyesület debuted in the 1946–47 season of the Hungarian League and finished fifteenth.

Name Changes 
1909–1949: Testvériség Sport Egyesület
1949–1951: Rákospalotai Vasutas SK
1951–1954: Rákospalotai Lokomotív SK
1954–1957: Rákospalotai Törekvés
1957–present: Testvériség Sport Egyesület

References

External links
 Profile

Football clubs in Hungary
1909 establishments in Hungary